WKNZ (88.7 FM) is a non-commercial educational broadcast radio station licensed to Harrington, Delaware, United States. WKNZ is owned and operated by The Bridge of Hope, Inc.  WKNZ programming can also be heard on WNJH in Cape May, New Jersey WNKZ-FM to the south of Salisbury, Maryland and on 100.1 (W261AE) in Templeville, Maryland and on 94.9 (W235DD) in Ocean City, Maryland.

Programming
WKNZ broadcasts an adult Contemporary Christian music format, serving Central Delmarva.  The primary focus of the station is to bring people of different Christian denominations together, to strengthen families and churches through positive and uplifting music and to offer hope to people trying to find their way through difficult situations.

History
This station received its original construction permit from the Federal Communications Commission on January 25, 2008.  The new station was assigned the call letters WKNZ by the FCC on June 9, 2008.

In July 2009 the station unveiled its new name, logo and slogan: 88.7fm The Bridge, Connecting, Strengthening. Originally planned to launch in the first quarter of 2010, WKNZ began regular broadcast operations on Tuesday, December 7, 2010, at 10:00 a.m.

References

External links
WKNZ official website
WKNZ construction blog

Contemporary Christian radio stations in the United States
Radio stations established in 2009
KNZ
2009 establishments in Delaware
Dover, Delaware